The Codex Frisingensis, designated by r and q or 64 (in Beuron system), is a 6th or 7th century Latin manuscript of the New Testament. The text, written on vellum, is a version of the old Latin. The manuscript contains the text of the Pauline epistles with numerous lacunae on only 26 parchment leaves.

The manuscript is variously dated. Vogels and Wordsworth dated it to the 5th or 6th century, Merk to the 7th century, Bover and Kilpatrick to the 7th or 8th century.

 Contents
Rom 14:10-15:13; 1 Cor 1:1-27; 1:28-3:5; 6:1-7:7; 15:1-1:43; 16:12-27; 2 Cor 1:1-2:10; 3:17-5:1; 7:10-8:12; 9:10-11:21; 12:14-13:10; Gal 2:5-4:3; 6:5-17; Eph 1:1-13; 1:16-2:16; 6:24; Phil 1:1-20; 1 Tim 1:12-2:15; 5:18-6:13; Hbr 6:6-7:5; 7:8-8:1; 9:27-11:7.

1 John 3:8 - 5:9.

Text 
The Latin text of the codex is a representative of the Western text-type in the itala recension.

In 1 Corinthians 2:4 it supports reading πειθοις σοφιας λογοις (plausible words of wisdom) – (א λογος) B (Dgr 33 πιθοις) Dc 181 1739 1877 1881 vgww eth.

It contains the Comma Johanneum.

History 
Eight leaves were examined by Tischendorf in 1856.
It was examined by Henry J. White, Wordsworth, Donatien de Bruyne, Leo Ziegler, and A. Jülicher.

Currently it is housed at the Bayerische Staatsbibliothek (Clm 6436) in Munich.

See also 

 List of New Testament Latin manuscripts

References

Further reading 

 C. v. Tischendorf, Deutsche Zeitschrift für christliche Wissenschaft und christliches Leben,  1857, Nr.8, p. 57-61. 
 D. de Bruyne, Les Fragments de Freising, Collectanea biblica Latina, V; (Rome, 1921). 
 Leo Ziegler, Italafragmente der Paulinischen Briefe. Marburg 1876, pp. 33–56. 
 A. Jülicher, Itala. Das Neue Testament in Altlateinischer Überlieferung, Walter de Gruyter, Berlin, New York, 1976.

External links 
 Image

Vetus Latina New Testament manuscripts
6th-century biblical manuscripts